Mohammad Dalirian (born 2 June 1952) is an Iranian wrestler. He competed in the men's Greco-Roman 68 kg at the 1972 Summer Olympics.

References

1952 births
Living people
Iranian male sport wrestlers
Olympic wrestlers of Iran
Wrestlers at the 1972 Summer Olympics
Place of birth missing (living people)
Asian Games gold medalists for Iran
Asian Games medalists in wrestling
Wrestlers at the 1974 Asian Games
Medalists at the 1974 Asian Games
20th-century Iranian people
21st-century Iranian people